William Lindsay (15 August 1945 – 14 May 1986) was a British actor.

His television credits include Colditz, Enemy at the Door, Doctor Who (in the serial State of Decay), Angels and Blake's 7.

Filmography

External links
 

British male television actors
1945 births
1986 deaths
20th-century British male actors